Con alma y vida (With Life and Soul) is a 1970 Argentine film noir directed and written by David José Kohon and Norberto Aroldi and with music by Ástor Piazzolla.

The film received a positive review in La Gaceta and was awarded the 1971 Silver Condor Award for Best Director from the Argentinean Film Critics Association.

Cast
 María Aurelia Bisutti
 Norberto Aroldi
 José María Langlais
 David Llewelyn
 Roberto Escalada
 Roberto Airaldi
 Beba Bidart
 Nora Cullen
 Francisco de Paula
 Nené Morales
 Alberto Mazzini
 Héctor Gance
 María Armand
 Luis Orbegozo
 Pajarito Zaguri
Jorge Anselmi

References

External links

1970 films
1970s Spanish-language films
1970 comedy-drama films
Films directed by David José Kohon
1970 comedy films
1970 drama films
Argentine comedy-drama films
1970s Argentine films